Urophora vera is a species of tephritid or fruit flies in the genus Urophora of the family Tephritidae.

Distribution
Urophora vera are situated in Palaearctic Region.

References

Urophora
Insects described in 1996
Diptera of Asia